Funani Jerry Maseko (born 21 July 1966) is a South African politician who has represented the African National Congress (ANC) in the Limpopo Provincial Legislature since 2019. He was elected to his seat in the 2019 general election, ranked 11th on the ANC's party list.

Maseko was born on 21 July 1966. He was active in anti-apartheid student politics while training as a teacher in the 1980s, and in the 1990s he ascended the local and regional ranks of the ANC Youth League in the province. He represented the ANC as a local councillor in Limpopo from 1995 to 2011, first in the Eastern Tubatse–Ohrigstad transitional council from 1995 to 2000 and then in the Sekhukhune District Municipality in 2000 to 2011, ultimately serving as a Member of the Mayoral Committee and Chief Whip in Sekhukhune. 

He was also active in the Sekhukhune regional branch of the ANC, and he was elected as its Regional Secretary in 2014 and re-elected in 2017. In 2020, he was widely expected to challenge the incumbent, Stanley Ramaila, for the chairmanship of the regional party, but when the next regional elective conference was held in December 2021 he did not stand and he was succeeded as Regional Secretary by Tala Mathope.

References

External links 

 

Living people
1966 births
Members of the Limpopo Provincial Legislature
African National Congress politicians